Glenfiddich distillery is a Speyside single malt Scotch whisky distillery owned by William Grant & Sons in the Scottish burgh of Dufftown in Moray. The name Glenfiddich derives from the Scottish Gaelic Gleann Fhiodhaich meaning "valley of the deer", which is reflected in Glenfiddich's stag logo.

History

The Glenfiddich Distillery was founded in 1886 by William Grant in Dufftown, Scotland, in the glen of the River Fiddich. The Glenfiddich single malt whisky first ran from the stills on Christmas Day, 1887.

In the 1920s, with prohibition in force in the US, Glenfiddich was one of a very small number of distilleries to increase production. This put them in a strong position to meet the sudden rise in demand for fine aged whiskies that came with the repeal of prohibition.

In the 1950s, the Grant family built up an onsite infrastructure that included coppersmiths to maintain the copper stills, and a dedicated cooperage that is now one of the very few remaining in distilleries. In 1956 the Grant's brand launched the now-iconic triangular bottle, designed by Hans Schleger.

Following difficult times in the 1960s and '70s, many small, independent distillers were bought up or went out of business. In order to survive, W. Grant & Sons expanded their production of the drink, and introduced advertising campaigns and a visitors' centre. In this period they also took the decision to begin marketing single malt as a premium brand in its own right, effectively creating the modern single malt whisky category with the 1963 introduction of Glenfiddich single malt to the United States and other foreign markets.Later, W. Grant & Sons was one of the first distilleries to package its bottles in tubes and gift tins, as well as recognising the importance of the duty-free market for spirits. This marketing strategy was successful, and Glenfiddich has since become the world's best-selling single malt. It is sold in 180 countries, and accounts for about 35% of single malt sales.

Glenfiddich is currently managed by the fifth generation of William Grant's descendants.

In September 2014, William Grant & Sons agreed to acquire Drambuie for an undisclosed price rumoured to be in the region of £100 million.

Since 2002, Glenfiddich has an Artists in Residence (AiR) programme with a total budget of £130,000 allowing artists to stay and work in the distillery each year. In 2019 there were eight artists in residence and in 2021, there were six artists in residence.

In 2021, the distillery began converting distillery trucks to run on Biogas made from the distillery waste products.

Production and location
The Glenfiddich distillery produce the Glenfiddich whisky in Dufftown, Moray.

Glenfiddich is a single malt Scotch whisky, this means the whisky was distilled at a single distillery using a pot still distillation process and must be made from a mash of malted barley.

Onsite there are 31 distinctively-shaped "swan neck" copper pot stills. These stills are smaller than those now in use at most other major distilleries. All stills are handmade and Glenfiddich employs a team of craftsmen and coppersmiths to maintain them. These stills have a capacity of around 13,000,000 litres of spirit.

The water source for Glenfiddich Whisky is The Robbie Dhu springs nearby to the distillery.

Glenfiddich is matured in many different casks, such as:

 Rum casks from the Caribbean
 Bourbon whiskey barrels from America
 Sherry butts from Jerez de la Frontera in Spain

Once the spirit has matured, the casks are emptied and the whisky is "cut" with pure Robbie Dhu spring water.

Glenfiddich has a bottling hall onsite along with a large bottling plant in Bellshill.

Glenfiddich is a distillery in Scotland's Malt Whisky Trail, a tourism initiative featuring seven working Speyside distilleries including Glenfiddich, a historic distillery (Dallas Dhu, now a museum) and the Speyside Cooperage.

Whiskies

Core range
 Glenfiddich 12-year-old 
 Glenfiddich 15-year-old 
 Glenfiddich 18-year-old 
 Glenfiddich 21-year-old

Liqueur
 Glenfiddich Malt Whisky Liqueur: Until 2011 Glenfiddich produced a liqueur that was 40% alcohol by volume, and sold in 50 cl (500 ml) bottles.

Critical acclaim
Glenfiddich's whiskies have performed well at international spirits ratings competitions.  The 12, 15, 18, and 21-year offerings have all rated well in the San Francisco World Spirits Competition and the Beverage Testing Institutes' reviews. On balance, the 15-year whisky has performed the best, receiving three double-gold medals (in four years) at the 2007–2010 San Francisco competitions and a score of 91 with the Beverage Testing Institute.

Glenfiddich Awards
Started in 1970, Glenfiddich promoted the Glenfiddich Food and Drink Awards to honour distinguished writing and broadcasting in the fields of food and drink in the UK. In 2008, Glenfiddich decided to discontinue distributing Food and Drink Awards, reviewing their "strategy, scope and potential application in some of Glenfiddich’s key markets outside the UK."

Started in 1998, Glenfiddich promoted the Glenfiddich Spirit of Scotland Awards. The Glenfiddich Spirit of Scotland Awards were annual awards given to notable Scottish people. Glenfiddich sponsored the event, in association with The Scotsman newspaper. Nine awards were distributed for art, business, environment, food, music, screen, sport, writing and "Top Scot". A consulting panel nominated four people in each category, with the winner decided by a public vote. The "Top Scot" is an open award, with the public able to nominate anyone. The awards haven't been hosted since 2014.

In popular culture
 Glenfiddich was the favourite whisky of fictional detective Inspector Morse, as well as his creator Colin Dexter.
 In the film The Dogs of War, Christopher Walken is seen carrying two bottles of Glenfiddich 10 Year Old in his luggage upon arrival to the fictional country of Zangaro.
 In the 150th episode of Family Guy, "Brian & Stewie", Brian Griffin keeps a bottle of what appears to be Glenfiddich 12 Year Old in a safe deposit box as a last drink should he intend to kill himself. On the full uncut version of the episode he confirms to Stewie that it is indeed Glenfiddich.
 In the 2004 film Hotel Rwanda, the lead character Paul Rusesabagina, played by Don Cheadle, bribes General Augustin Bizimungu with bottles of Glenfiddich in exchange for favourable treatment by his soldiers.
 In the novel The Girl Who Kicked the Hornets' Nest by Stieg Larsson, Evert Gullberg, a former intelligence officer, although not fond of alcohol; pours himself a glass of Glenfiddich.
 In the sitcom The Vicar of Dibley, David Horton desperately attempts to conceal a bottle of Glenfiddich from his guests, who he believes aren't worth wasting the fine whisky (due to their working-class status). However, when the eponymous vicar arrives, she spots the hidden bottle much to David's dismay and his guests' delight.
 In the television series Falling Skies Captain Weaver and Dr. Glass share a bottle of 30-year-old Glenfiddich.
 In the 2016 film Star Trek Beyond, Doctor Leonard McCoy and Captain James T. Kirk share a drink from a fictionalised Glenfiddich 30-year-old Single Malt. In contrast to the Glenfiddich norm, the bottle featured in the film was square-based rather than the iconic triangular shape the brand is renowned for.
 In the FX TV show Archer, there are several instances where the main characters drink "Glengoolie", which is a parody of Glenfiddich.
 In the 2012 movie Jack Reacher, the triangular green bottle is on the table when Rosamund Pike goes to talk with shooter suspect's father.
 A number of Glenfiddich whiskies feature in bars on the Yakuza video game series as part of their long-running product placement deal with Suntory.

See also
 List of whisky distilleries in Scotland

References

External links
 

Scottish brands
Distilleries in Scotland
William Grant & Sons
Scottish malt whisky
1887 introductions
1886 establishments in Scotland
Companies based in Moray